Fuernrohria is a monotypic genus of flowering plants belonging to the family Apiaceae. It contains one species, Fuernrohria setifolia K.Koch.

Its native range is Turkey, North Caucasus, Transcaucasus and north-western Iran.

The genus name of Fuernrohria is in honour of August Emanuel Fürnrohr (1804–1861), German botanist and professor at a school in Regensburg, it was first published and described in Linnaea Vol.16 on page 356 in 1842.

References

Apioideae
Plants described in 1842
Flora of Turkey
Flora of Iran
Flora of the Caucasus